Graham Stuart Beckel (born December 22, 1949) is an American character actor. He is known for his guest appearances on television but has had roles in several major films as well. He is known for his roles as Franklin Ford in the drama film The Paper Chase, and Dick Stensland in Curtis Hanson's L.A. Confidential. He also played Jack Fisk on Battlestar Galactica and Hal Sanders on Heroes. Beckel also appeared in The Astronaut Farmer as Frank, a customer at the diner.

Beckel portrayed oil tycoon Ellis Wyatt in Atlas Shrugged (2011). He has a recurring role on the AMC TV show Halt & Catch Fire as Nathan Cardiff, owner of the show's fictional company "Cardiff Electric".

He is the younger brother of the late political strategist and TV commentator Bob Beckel.

Filmography

References

External links 
 
 

1949 births
Living people
Male actors from New York City
American male film actors
American male television actors
21st-century American male actors
20th-century American male actors